Bernina Suot railway station, formerly known as Berninahäuser railway station, is a railway station in the municipality of Pontresina, in the Swiss canton of Graubünden. It is located on the Bernina line of the Rhaetian Railway.

The station has a two through tracks and two platforms and a station building. There is also a siding, and an avalanche proof building housing a turntable for use by the line's snowploughs.

The station was opened with the line in 1910, but the railway line and station building were reconstructed in 1993.

Services
The following services stop at Bernina Suot:

References

External links
 
 

Railway stations in Switzerland opened in 1909
Railway stations in Graubünden
Rhaetian Railway stations